Udayadityavarman II ruled the Angkor Kingdom from 1050 to 1066 A.D. He was the successor of Suryavarman I but not his son; he descended from Yasovarman I's spouse.

He built the Baphuon Temple to honor the god Shiva, but some of the sculptures are dedicated to Buddha. He also completed the construction of the West Baray reservoir and built the West Mebon, a raised-earth island in the center.

During his reign, several attempted rebellions, in 1051 and 1065, were crushed by his general Sangrama.

The Sdok Kak Thom temple, located near the present day Thai town of Aranyaprathet, was also constructed during his reign. The temple is perhaps most famous as the discovery site of a detailed inscription recounting the sequence of previous Khmer kings. The inscription stele is now part of the collection of the national museum in Bangkok.

He was succeeded by his younger brother Harshavarman III.

References

 History of Cambodia.  Accessed June 7, 2004.

11th-century Cambodian monarchs
Khmer Empire
Hindu monarchs
Cambodian Hindus
1066 deaths
Year of birth unknown